During the 2000–01 English football season, Sunderland A.F.C. competed in the FA Premier League.

Season summary
Sunderland enjoyed another strong season, and briefly occupied second place in February, but the Black Cats were unable to keep up their excellent form, and they had to settle for seventh place – just as they did last season, and not quite enough for UEFA Cup qualification.

Results
Sunderland's score comes first

Legend

FA Premier League

League table

Results summary

Results by round

FA Cup

League Cup

Players

First-team squad
Squad at end of season

Left club during season

Reserve squad

Transfers

In

Summer

January

Out

Summer

January

Statistics

Appearances and goals
As of end of season

|-
! colspan=14 style=background:#dcdcdc; text-align:center| Goalkeepers
|-

|-
! colspan=14 style=background:#dcdcdc; text-align:center| Defenders
|-

|-
! colspan=14 style=background:#dcdcdc; text-align:center| Midfielders:
|-

|-
! colspan=14 style=background:#dcdcdc; text-align:center| Forwards:
|-

|-
|colspan="14"|Players no longer with club:
|-

|-
|}

Notes

References

Sunderland A.F.C. seasons
Sunderland